Daveh Meydani (also Romanized as Daveh Meydānī) is a village in Varqeh Rural District, in the Central District of Charuymaq County, East Azerbaijan Province, Iran. At the 2006 census, its population was 44 people, distributed in 8 families.

References 

Populated places in Charuymaq County